Gilli is a surname. Notable people with the surname include:

Alexander Gilli (1904–2007), Austrian botanist
Anna Caterina Gilli, Italian painter
Carlotta Gilli (born 2001), Italian Paralympic swimmer
Christina Gilli-Brügger (born 1956), Swiss cross-country skier
Christoph Gilli (1963–2010), Swiss footballer
Filippo Gilli (born 2000), Italian footballer
Luciana Gilli (born 1944), Italian actress
Markus Gilli (born 1955), Swiss journalist
Pierina Gilli (1911–1991), Italian Catholic visionary
Yvonne Gilli (born 1957), Swiss politician

See also
Gilli (disambiguation)